Björn Johan Lind (born March 22, 1978, in Ljusterö, Uppland) is a Swedish former cross-country skier who competed since 2000. Competing in three Winter Olympics, he won gold medals in both the Individual and Team sprint events at Turin in 2006.

Lind's best finish at the FIS Nordic World Ski Championships was a fourth in the individual sprint twice (2005, 2007). He has three World Cup victories in individual sprint events since 2005.

After the 2010–11 season, Lind retired.

Cross-country skiing results
All results are sourced from the International Ski Federation (FIS).

Olympic Games
 2 medals – (2 gold)

World Championships

World Cup

Season titles
 1 title – (1 sprint)

Season standings

Individual podiums
 3 victories – (3 ) 
 7 podiums – (7 )

Team podiums
 1 victory – (1 )
 6 podiums – (6 )

References

External links
 
 
 
 Björn Lind slutar med skidåkning 

1978 births
Living people
People from Österåker Municipality
Cross-country skiers from Stockholm County
Cross-country skiers at the 2002 Winter Olympics
Cross-country skiers at the 2006 Winter Olympics
Cross-country skiers at the 2010 Winter Olympics
Olympic gold medalists for Sweden
Olympic cross-country skiers of Sweden
Swedish male cross-country skiers
Olympic medalists in cross-country skiing
Medalists at the 2006 Winter Olympics
Hudiksvalls IF skiers
IFK Umeå skiers